Fontpédrouse is a commune in the Pyrénées-Orientales department in southern France.

Geography 
Fontpédrouse is located in the canton of Les Pyrénées catalanes and in the arrondissement of Prades. Fontpédrouse-Saint-Thomas-les-Bains station has rail connections to Villefranche-de-Conflent and Latour-de-Carol.

History 
On , the commune of Prats-Saint-Thomas was merged into Fontpédrouse.

In December 1932, parts of the hamlets of Prats-Saint-Thomas were destroyed because of heavy rains which caused several landslides.

Population

See also
Communes of the Pyrénées-Orientales department

References

Communes of Pyrénées-Orientales